GBA-2 (Gilgit-II) is a constituency of Gilgit Baltistan Assembly which was represented by the Fatehullah Khan of Pakistan Tehreek-e-Insaf.

Members of Assembly

2009 Elections
Deedar Ali an independent politician became member of assembly by getting 5241 votes.

2015 Elections
Hafiz Hafeez Ur Rehman of Pakistan Muslim League (N) won this seat by getting 10,739 votes and became Chief Minister of Gilgit Baltistan.

2020 Elections

References

Gilgit-Baltistan Legislative Assembly constituencies